Chroust is a Czech surname. Notable people with the surname include:

 Anton-Hermann Chroust (1907–1982), German-American jurist, philosopher, and historian
 Gerhard Chroust (born 1941), Austrian systems scientist

See also
 

Czech-language surnames